Hamarhus at Hamar in Hedmark, Norway was originally the fortified palace of the Bishop of the Ancient Diocese of Hamar.
It is now the site of Storhamarlåven, an exhibit of  Anno Museum.

History
The palace was east for Hamar Cathedral, and was linked to the cathedral. The palace was constructed in stages, the oldest parts of stonework was erected around 1250 or a little later, and consists of three vault cellars white wooden roofing, and a large castle tower with ground floor approx, 10 x 18 m, with basement. 
After the reformation, the former  bishop's residence was used by the local Lensherren.  Both Hamarhus and Hamar Cathedral were destroyed in 1567 by the Swedish armies during the Northern Seven Years' War. The ruins of Hamarhus were later converted into the barn and outbuilding on Storhamar farm. The barn was built in the 18th and 19th century, using the ruins of the medieval bishop's palace as parts of the walls.

Storhamarlåven
The Storhamar barn  (Storhamarlåven) and former farm buildings were converted into a museum between 1967 and 1979.  Storhamarlåven was designed by architect Sverre Fehn (1924–2009) in concrete, wood and glass to contrast with the stone of the medieval ruins. Sverre Fehn included modern installations while preserving historical remain as well as providing the further archeological excavations. Construction work began in 1969, the barn was completed in 1971 and the south wing with the auditorium in 1973. The exhibitions were completed in 1979.

See also
Cathedral Ruins in Hamar

References

Other Sources
Ersland, Geir Atle; Sandvik, Hilde (1999). Norsk historie 1300-1625 ( Oslo: Samlaget)  
 Gjerset, Knut  (1915) History of the Norwegian People   (The MacMillan Company,  Volume II)
 Gunnarsjaa, Arne (2006) Norges Arkitekturhistorie''  (Abstrakt forlag)

External links
 Anno Museum official website
Images of Storhamarlåven 

Forts in Norway
Palaces in Norway
Former palaces
Episcopal palaces
Buildings and structures in Hamar
History of Hamar
Military installations in Innlandet